Events from the year 1931 in Sweden

Incumbents
 Monarch – Gustaf V
 Prime Minister – Carl Gustaf Ekman

Events
14 May – The Ådalen shootings: During a general strike in Ådalen, military troops fired gunshots into a crowd of demonstrants. Five persons were killed in the massacre, and five were injured.

Births
 31 March – Göran Printz-Påhlson, writer (died 2006)
 15 April – Tomas Tranströmer, poet
 23 June – Ola Ullsten, politician
 16 July – Kjell Hansson, Olympic rower
 27 August – Sven Tumba, ice hockey player (died 2011).

Deaths

 8 April – Erik Axel Karlfeldt, poet (born 1864)
 12 July – Nathan Söderblom, clergyman, archbishop (born 1866)
 13 October –  Ernst Didring, writer (born 1868)
  – Anna Sandström

References

 
Sweden
Years of the 20th century in Sweden